Savage Island or Savage Islands may refer to:

Islands
Niue (formerly "Savage Island"), an associated state of New Zealand in the South Pacific Ocean
Savage Island (Alaska)
Savage Islands, a small Portuguese archipelago in the North Atlantic Ocean off the Canary Islands
Savage Island (Washington)

Entertainment
Savage Islands (film), a 1983 adventure film starring Tommy Lee Jones
Savage Island (album), a 2008 album released by rapper Savage

See also
Lower Savage Islands, Nunavut, Canada
Middle Savage Islands, Nunavut, Canada